Interactive communication is an exchange of ideas where both participants, whether human, machine or art form, are active and can have an effect on one another. It is a dynamic, two-way flow of information. 

Many forms of communication previously thought one-way, like books and television, have become interactive with the rise of computers, the Internet, and digital and mobile devices. These developing collaborative technologies, or new media, have rapidly increased the opportunities for interactive communication across mediums, disciplines, cultures, social classes, locations, and even time. 

Interactive communication is a modern term that encompasses these evolving forms of conversation. It is a primary characteristic of the present Information Age. New experiments in interaction design are evolving on a daily basis. 

Interactive communication forms include basic dialogue and nonverbal communication, game-books, interactive fiction and storytelling, hypertext, interactive television and movies, photo and video manipulation, video sharing, video games, social media, user-generated content, interactive marketing and public relations, augmented reality, ambient intelligence, and virtual reality.

History of Interactivity
Interactivity is rooted in basic communication, the development of rhetoric, and the evolution of social interface. Gesture, touch and body language were the earliest forms of communication. The time line of spoken and written language’s emergence is still under debate. Rhetoric is the effective use of language.

Once human cognition and thought evolved, varieties of language and communication proliferated. Braille and sign language are forms of interface, as are the arts of music, cooking, photography and fashion. Politics, trade, international relations, immigration and war are examples of group interaction. 

Industrial design, the aesthetics and engineering of human and machine interface, arrived with the Industrial Revolution. Examples of perfected usability include the chopstick, the corkscrew and the paper clip. The automobile dashboard, the iconic Fender Stratocaster electrical guitar, and popular telephones from the Western Electric Model 302 rotary dial to the Apple iPhone multi-touch screen are examples of effective control panels. 

Interest in interactive communication has grown with the increase in human-computer interaction. Hardware peripherals include keyboards, mice, game controllers and webcams. Graphical user interface examples include the desktop metaphor, software programs like Microsoft Office and Adobe Photoshop, websites and web browsers, search engines, and the increasing number of smartphone mobile applications. 

An important consideration in the development of any modern user interface is its interactivity.

References

External links 
 http://www.businessdictionary.com/definition/interactive-communications.html 
 Master's degree in Interactive Communications at Quinnipiac University
 

Communication
Interactivity